Camillo Morigia (15 September 1743, Ravenna - 16 January 1795, Ravenna) was a north-Italian neo-classical architect. He is most notable for his designs for the Tomb of Dante and the facade of Santa Maria in Porto Basilica, both in his home-town of Ravenna.

Biography
He was born in Ravenna from the illustrious family of Moriggia. His father was an important member of the nobility of Ravenna and when he died Camillo inherited the title of count. He was the last member of the main branch of the rich family Moriggia.

References

Bibliography 
 Nullo Pirazzoli, Paolo Fabbri, Camillo Morigia (1743-1795). Architettura e riformismo nelle Legazioni, con un saggio di Marco Dezzi Bardeschi, Imola, University Press Bologna, 1976
 Nullo Pirazzoli, Ravenna nel Settecento in Storia di Ravenna, vol. IV (a cura di Lucio Gambi), Venezia, Marsilio Editori, 1994

18th-century Italian architects
Italian neoclassical architects
1743 births
1795 deaths
People from Ravenna